This is a list of National Historic Sites in Hamilton, Ontario.  There are 15 National Historic Sites designated in Hamilton, of which one is administered by Parks Canada (identified below by the beaver icon ).   Burlington Heights was designated in 1929 and was the first site designated within what are now the boundaries of Hamilton.

Numerous National Historic Events also occurred in Hamilton, and are identified at places associated with them, using the same style of federal plaque which marks National Historic Sites. Several National Historic Persons are commemorated throughout the city in the same way. The markers do not indicate which designation—a Site, Event, or Person—a subject has been given.

National Historic Sites located elsewhere in Ontario are listed at National Historic Sites in Ontario.

This list uses names designated by the national Historic Sites and Monuments Board, which may differ from other names for these sites.

National Historic Sites

See also
History of Hamilton, Ontario

References

 
Hamilton
National Historic Sites of Canada